Luis Maximiliano Juan Gindre Musso (5 July 1915 – 27 November 1990) was an Argentine sports shooter. He competed at the 1956 Summer Olympics and the 1960 Summer Olympics.

References

1915 births
1990 deaths
Argentine male sport shooters
Olympic shooters of Argentina
Shooters at the 1956 Summer Olympics
Shooters at the 1960 Summer Olympics
Sportspeople from Buenos Aires
20th-century Argentine people